The inauguration of Hassan Rouhani as the 7th President of Iran for his second term took place in two rounds, first on Thursday 3 August 2017, when he received his presidential precept from Supreme Leader Ali Khamenei, and second on Saturday 5 August, when he was sworn into office in the Parliament of Iran. This marked the commencement of the second four-year term of Hassan Rouhani as president and his vice president. The oath of office was administered by Chief Justice Sadeq Larijani.

Credential ceremony
In a ceremony on 3 August 2017, Ayatollah Ali Khamenei formally endorsed Hassan Rouhani as president for a second four-year tenure. The ceremony, held at the Imam Khomeini Hussainia in Tehran, was attended by Parliament speaker Ali Larijani, Judiciary chief Sadeq Larijani and other senior military and government dignitaries. The practice, enshrined constitutionally, comes before Rouhani's inauguration on 5 August as president.

Interior Minister Abdolreza Rahmani Fazli, was first present a report on the 12th presidential election, followed by a reading of Rouhani's validation order by Mohammadi Golpayegani, Head of Ayatollah Khamenei's Office. The ceremony followed by a speech from President Rouhani and the Supreme Leader Ayatollah Khamenei. In comments following the endorsement, Rouhani pledged economic growth and employment.

Inauguration ceremony
The second part of the ceremony was held at the Iranian Parliament for the swearing-in of the president. The ceremony started at 5:00 p.m. local time (12:30 GMT), with an orchestra playing the national anthem. Several verses from the Quran were read as well, and then speaker of the country's Parliament Ali Larijani and head of the country's judiciary Sadeq Larijani addressed the guests of the ceremony.

After that, Rouhani read and signed the text of the oath, and promised to use all his powers to protect the religion, order in the country and the constitution. President Rouhani promised that in his second term, Iran will pursue a path of coexistence and interaction with the world. "Promoting constructive interaction with the world, deepening bonds with neighboring and regional countries, and developing cooperation with friendly states are not only an informed choice but also a necessity to improve international peace and security," he said. Rouhani also made a call for unity, saying it is time to act in unison to advance Iran. "I extend my hand to all those who seek the greatness of the country," he said.

The proposed lineup of Rouhani's second cabinet is to be unveiled within two weeks of the oath-taking ceremony. Rouhani was expected to announce his 18 ministerial nominees to the parliament for a vote of confidence after the inauguration, but Vice President for Parliamentary Affairs Hossein-Ali Amiri announced earlier that the list has not been finalized yet.

Foreign dignitaries
According to reports, the level of foreign dignitaries taking part in Rouhani's inauguration would be “unprecedented”. The following leaders attended the swearing in ceremony:

Security
Security in the capital has been increased to the highest level, the police said, two months after gunmen linked to the ISIL attacked the parliament and the mausoleum of the late Ayatollah Ruhollah Khomeini, killing 17 people.

See also

First Inauguration of Hassan Rouhani

References

2017 in Iran
2017 in politics
August 2017 events in Iran
Ceremonies in Iran
2017 Iranian presidential election
Presidency of Hassan Rouhani
Rouhani